The High Commissioner of the Republic in French Polynesia is the highest representative of the French Republic in the overseas country of French Polynesia. The rank is equivalent to the one of a Prefect and its powers are governed by Organic Law 2004–192.

The High Commissioner is directly appointed by the President of the French Republic. He enacts local laws (known as Lois du Pays) with the countersignature of the President of French Polynesia and ensures their publication in the Journal Officiel de la Polynésie française. He is competent for every matters not devolved to the Government of French Polynesia. Until 1984, he has assumed the powers now exercised by the President of French Polynesia.

The overseas minor territory of Clipperton Island falls also under the jurisdiction of the High Commissioner since it is uninhabited and has no local administration.

The official residence and the office of the High Commissioner are housed at the Haut-Commissariat in Papeete.

List of state representatives in French Polynesia
The representative of France hold different titles throughout history. During the period of the protectorate on the Kingdom of Tahiti, this title reflected the political regime of France:

 Commissioner of the King (1842 – 1848)
 Commissioner of the Republic (1848 – 1852)
 Commissioner of the Empire (1852 – 1870)
 Commissioner of the Republic (1870 – 1880)

After the final annexation of Tahiti by the French Third Republic, the Kingdom of Tahiti was dissolved and the French Establishments of Oceania were created. The state representative was titled Governor until 13 July 1977 when the final name of High Commissioner of the Republic was adopted.

See also
French Polynesia
Politics of French Polynesia
President of French Polynesia
Assembly of French Polynesia
Prefect

References

	

French Polynesian politicians
French Polynesia
Colonial and Departmental Heads
High Commissioners of the Republic in French Polynesia